World Trade Center San Salvador (WTCSS) is a complex of buildings located in San Salvador, El Salvador. It consists in 3 towers: two of 8 floors, each with 13,000 m² of profitable area for offices and the Torre Futura of 20 floors. The first two towers have maintained a 100% of occupancy by multinational prestigious companies and embassies. El Salvador and Panama, are the only countries that have a World Trade Center in the Centroamerican region.

The WTCSS complex consists in six main elements:

 Torre Futura
 Plaza Futura
 Towers I y II
 Interconnection with the Crowne Plaza Hotel and its convention center
 Five levels of parking with capacity for over 1,100 vehicles
 Quattro (Under construction) (12 floors, 5 for parking and 7 for offices)

See also 
 Torre Futura
 Plaza Futura

External links 
 www.torrefutura.com
 www.plazafutura.com.sv
 www.agrisal.com

Buildings and structures in San Salvador
San Salvador